Scott Bacon (born 27 August 1977) is a former Australian politician.  Bacon represented the electorates of Denison and then Clark (after renaming) in the Tasmanian House of Assembly from 2010 to 2019 as a member of the Labor Party.

Career
He was educated at Cosgrove High School, Elizabeth College and the University of Tasmania, where he studied economics. He is the son of former Premier of Tasmania Jim Bacon.

Bacon was elected at the 2010 Tasmanian state election, securing 10.3% of first preferences. The Labor ticket for Denison included three sitting Labor MPs (including the Premier, David Bartlett) but only Bartlett and Bacon were elected, with two sitting members Lisa Singh and Graeme Sturges losing their seats.

In May 2011, Bacon was made a member of Cabinet following Bartlett's resignation, holding the portfolios of Tourism, Hospitality and Veteran's Affairs.

After the Giddings government was defeated in 2014 state election, Bacon was given the role of Shadow Treasurer by new Opposition Leader Bryan Green.

Bacon announced his resignation in August 2019.

References

External links
ScottBacon.com official website

|-

|-

1977 births
Living people
Australian Labor Party members of the Parliament of Tasmania
Members of the Tasmanian House of Assembly
University of Tasmania alumni
Politicians from Perth, Western Australia
21st-century Australian politicians